Liu E (also spelled Liu O; 18 October 1857 – 23 August 1909), courtesy name Tieyun, was a Chinese writer, archaeologist and politician of the late Qing Dynasty.

Government and politics
Liu was a native of Dantu (modern day Zhenjiang). In the government he worked with flood control, famine relief, and railroads. He became disillusioned with official ideas of reform and became a proponent of private economic development modeled after western systems. During the Boxer Uprising he speculated in government rice, distributing it to the poor. He was cashiered for these efforts, but shrewd investments had left him wealthy enough to follow his pioneering archaeological studies and to write fiction.

Literature
Liu's best known work is The Travels of Lao Can, which the critic C.T. Hsia calls the "most beloved  of all the novels" in the last decade of the Qing. 

Liu E's novels borrowed allusions and images from classical Chinese literature and used extensive symbolism. Therefore, his works appealed to readers who had a classical education and were considered sophisticated.

Oracle bone archaeology and scholarship
In 1903 Liu published the first collection of 1,058 oracle bone rubbings entitled Tieyun Canggui (鐵雲藏龜, Tie Yun's [i.e., Liu E] Repository of Turtles) that helped launch the study of oracle bone inscriptions as a distinct branch of Chinese epigraphy.

Exile and death
Liu was framed for malfeasance related to his work during the Boxer Rebellion and was exiled in 1908, dying within the next year in Dihua of the Xinjiang Province (today known as Ürümqi).

Notes

References
 Doleželová-Velingerová, Milena. "Chapter 38: Fiction from the End of the Empire to the Beginning of the Republic (1897–1916)" in: Mair, Victor H. (editor). The Columbia History of Chinese Literature. Columbia University Press, 13 August 2013. p. 697–731. , 9780231528511.
 

 Shen, Tianyou, Encyclopedia of China, 1st ed.
 The Travels of Lao Ts'an, Liu T'ieh-yün (Liu E), translated by Harold Shadick, professor of Chinese literature in Cornell University. Ithaca: Cornell University Press, 1952. Reissued: New York; London: Columbia University Press, 1990. 277p. (A Morningside Book).
 The travels of Lao Can, translated by Yang Xianyi, Gladys Yang (Beijing: Panda Books, 1983; 176p.)

External links
 
 

Qing dynasty poets
Qing dynasty novelists
Chinese archaeologists
Chinese epigraphers
Chinese people of the Boxer Rebellion
1857 births
1909 deaths
Writers from Nanjing
Qing dynasty politicians from Jiangsu
Politicians from Nanjing
Poets from Jiangsu
19th-century Chinese poets
19th-century Chinese novelists
Chinese male novelists